The Municipality of Bexley was a local government area in the St George region of Sydney, New South Wales, Australia. The municipality was proclaimed as the Borough of Bexley on 28 June 1900 when it formally separated from the Municipal District of Hurstville, and included the modern suburbs of Bexley, Bexley North and Kingsgrove, with parts of Carlton, Bardwell Park, Bardwell Valley, Rockdale and Kogarah. From 1 January 1949, the council was amalgamated into the Municipality of Rockdale, with the passing of the Local Government (Areas) Act 1948.

Council history and location
The Bexley area was first incorporated on 25 March 1887, when the NSW Government Gazette published the proclamation declaring the "Municipal District of Hurstville", with its wards being created on 29 December 1887, including the "Bexley Ward". Although originally very much of a rural character, by the turn of the 20th century the population of the Bexley Ward area had reached 2850 and a group of local residents, including all three Bexley Ward aldermen, submitted a petition on 16 November 1899 to the NSW Governor, Earl Beauchamp, requesting the formation of a municipality with the name of the "Borough of Bexley", arguing that under the current arrangements in Hurstville, the Bexley Ward area was under-represented compared to its rate-paying contribution and was geographically distant from the rest of the council area The petition was subsequently accepted and the Bexley Borough Council was incorporated on 28 June 1900.

The first council was elected on 11 August 1900, with nine aldermen elected:

The council first met in the Debating Society Hall in Carlton on 15 August 1900, with Alderman James William Larbalestier elected as the first mayor. On 13 September, Alderman Charles Henry Austin was appointed Treasurer. On 11 November 1901, the Council Chambers on corner of Queen Victoria and Northbrook Streets, Bexley, was officially opened with a hybrid design consisting of alderman Paine's floorplan and architect William Kenwood's facade. From 28 December 1906, following the passing of the Local Government Act, 1906, the council was renamed as the "Municipality of Bexley".

Later history
In December 1920, Bexley combined with the councils of Rockdale, Hurstville, and Kogarah to form the St George County Council. The elected County Council was established to provide electricity to the Kogarah, Rockdale, Hurstville, and Bexley areas and ceased to exist when it was amalgamated with the Sydney County Council from 1 January 1980. Although for most of its history, Bexley council was elected at-large, on 18 March 1942 the municipality was divided into four wards: North, South, East and West wards.

By the end of the Second World War, the NSW Government had realised that its ideas of infrastructure expansion could not be effected by the present system of the patchwork of small municipal councils across Sydney and the Minister for Local Government, Joseph Cahill, passed a bill in 1948 that abolished a significant number of those councils. Under the Local Government (Areas) Act 1948, Bexley Municipal Council became the First Ward of the Municipality of Rockdale, which was located immediately to the east.

Mayors

Town Clerks

References

Bexley
Bexley
Bexley
Bexley